Albert Lybrock (18271886) was a German-born architect in the United States. The most well known work of his early career is the James Monroe Tomb. He was the most important architect in Richmond during the booming decade prior to the American Civil War. He also gave financial support for a regiment of local German-Americans in the Confederate States Army. He had the Haxall and Morson families as clients and may have been the designer of Morson’s Row and the Bolling Haxall House. Carl Ruehrmund worked together with him.

Work
 James Monroe Tomb
 Morson’s Row
 United States Custom House addition between Main Street and Bank Street  (now the Lewis F. Powell Jr. United States Courthouse (original central portion was designed by  
 The Miller School of Albemarle - Albemarle County

References

1827 births
1886 deaths
Architects from Richmond, Virginia
19th-century American architects
German emigrants to the United States